Alasdair mac Mhaighstir Alasdair (c. 1698–1770), legal name Alexander MacDonald, or, in Gaelic Alasdair MacDhòmhnaill, was a Scottish war poet, satirist, lexicographer, political writer and memoirist.
The poet's Gaelic name means "Alasdair, son of the Reverend Alasdair". His father, also named Alasdair, was known as Maighstir Alasdair ("Master Alexander") which was then the way of referring to a clergyman in Scottish Gaelic. In English, Maighstir Alasdair was known as the "Reverend Alexander MacDonald".

Alasdair mac Mhaighstir Alasdair was born into the minor Scottish nobility and Clan MacDonald of Clanranald inside a still extant house at Dalilea, around the dawn of the 18th-century. He was the second son of Maighstir Alasdair (Dr. Alexander MacDonald, 1st of Dalilea) who was the Non-juring Episcopalian Rector of Kilchoan and Tacksman of Dalilea.

MacDhòmhnaill is believed to have been homeschooled and to have received an education in both Classics and the Western canon from his father, before briefly attending University. In addition to being multilingual, Alasdair MacDhòmhnaill had the almost unheard of skill for the time in the Highlands and Islands of being able to read and write in the vernacular Scottish Gaelic language. Drawing upon the literature of the other many other languages he knew, Alasdair MacDhòmhnaill began composing Gaelic poetry very early.

According to Derrick Thomson, even though he would have been only a teenager at the time, a memoir by the poet suggests that he may have fought for Prince James Francis Edward Stuart during the Jacobite rising of 1715.

While teaching at a Protestant missionary school at Kilchoan run by the Society in Scotland for Propagating Christian Knowledge, the bard compiled the first secular book in Scottish Gaelic to be printed: Leabhar a Theagasc Ainminnin (1741), a Gaelic-English glossary.

According to literary scholar John Mackenzie, listening to English translations of Alasdair MacDhòmhnaill's Jacobite poetry read aloud allegedly helped persuade Prince Charles Edward Stuart to sail from France to Scotland and begin the Rising of 1745. Beginning with the raising of the Prince's standard at Glenfinnan, Alasdair MacDhòmhnaill fought as a military officer in the Clanranald Regiment. During that same uprising, The Clanranald Bard, as he has since been dubbed by Hamish Henderson, was chosen, due to his "skill in the Highland Language", to teach Scottish Gaelic to the Prince.

After the defeat of the uprising at the Battle of Culloden, Alasdair MacDhòmhnaill and his older brother Aonghas Beag MacDhòmhnaill (Angus MacDonald, 2nd of Dalilea) remained in hiding as outlaws until the Act of Indemnity was passed.

In 1751, MacDhòmhnaill published the second secular book in the Gaelic language in Edinburgh; Ais-Eiridh na Sean Chánoin Albannaich — (The Resurrection of the Old Scottish Language), which was a collection of his poetry. Due to its vocal attacks in verse against King George II, the House of Hanover, and the ruling Whig political party, copies of the book were rounded up and burned by the public hangman. Twelve copies of the original edition are now known to survive, however.

Alasdair mac Mhaighstir Alasdair, who was one of the most famous, most innovative, and most influential Gaelic Bards of the 18th century, died at Arisaig in 1770. He remains, along with 20th century Symbolist Bard Sorley MacLean, one of the two most important poets and writers in the history of Scottish Gaelic literature.

In a 2016 article, Scottish poet Alan Riach described translating into English Alasdair mac Mhaighstir Alasdair's immram poem Birlinn Chloinne Raghnaill ("The Birlinn of Clanranald"), about a sea voyage from Loch Eynort, in South Uist, to Carrickfergus, in Northern Ireland. Riach praised the genius of the poem's 18th-century author and how brilliantly he emulated both Homer and Virgil in telling his tale of men against the sea. Riach has also argued that The Birlinn of Clanranald, is, "one of the great poems of world literature", and that, in the same poem, Alasdair mac Mhaighstir Alasdair anticipated 20th- and 21st century literary movements, including both surrealism and Psychedelic literature.

In a 2020 article, Scottish nationalist Hamish MacPherson ranked the Clanranald Bard as one of the two greatest Scottish poets in any language. MacPherson also wrote, "It is a national disgrace that there is no national monument to Alasdair mac Mhaighstir Alasdair... I have no hesitation in saying that Alasdair is a seminal figure in the history of this country, for just as Robert Burns helped preserve the Scots language, so did Alasdair mac Mhaighstir Alasdair perform the same duty for Gaelic."

Family background
Alasdair mac Mhaighstir Alasdair was born around 1698, into both the Scottish nobility and Clan MacDonald of Clanranald. Through his great-grandmother Màiri, daughter of Angus MacDonald of Islay, he claimed descent from Scottish Kings Robert the Bruce and Robert II.

The Bard's father was Maighstir Alasdair MacDhòmhnaill (Fr. Alexander MacDonald, 1st of Dalilea), who was the Non-juring Church of Scotland Rector (this was prior to the Scottish Episcopal Church splitting from "The Kirk") of Ardnamurchan and lived as a tacksman at Dalilea in Moidart.

The Bard's father was a native of South Uist. Through his older brother, Ranald MacDonald, the Tacksman of Milton and Balivanich, Maighstir Alasdair was the uncle of the famous Flora MacDonald. He was also distantly related to The Captain of Clanranald. He graduated from the University of Glasgow in 1674 and shortly afterwards was assigned to the parish in Ardnamurchan. The poet's mother was a Maclachlan from Glencripesdale and the two came to reside at Dalilea at about the end of the 17th century.

At the time, the majority of Ardnamurchan was composed of Roman Catholics and the Episcopalians and Presbyterians who made up Maighstir Alasdair's parishioners were evenly spread over the whole district. The only Protestant church was located at Kilchoan, which was nearly thirty miles from the Minister's home at Dalilea. According to the local oral tradition, the minister would always leave at an early hour on Sundays, travel the whole distance on foot, and reach Kilchoan at noon. He would then preach, perform divine services for his congregation, and then return home on foot, arriving near midnight. The route taken in his journey is also preserved in the oral tradition.

After the overthrow of King James II in 1688, the Covenanters toppled the High Church Episcopalian leadership of the Church of Scotland and took complete and permanent control over the denomination. As a result, Presbyterianism became the established and only tolerated form of both Sunday service and church government within the Kingdom of Scotland. Maighstir Alasdair MacDhòmhnaill, however, refused to conform. In consequence he was declared deposed from his parish by the synod. However, the Rector was very popular and the presbytery of Lorne never succeeded in establishing a new minister in his place. It is said, however, that Rev. Colin Campbell, the Presbyterian minister of Ardchattan, came to Kilchoan upon the Christian Sabbath wearing a kilt and armed with a drawn claymore and a cocked pistol. Rev. Campbell then announced the Synod's deposition of Maighstir Alasdair MacDhòmhnaill with his back to the wall. Although both the Protestants and Catholics of the district intensely hated Rev. Campbell for being a ministeir na cuigse, or "Minister of the Whigs", he was allowed to deliver his message and leave Ardnamurchan none the worse for wear.

On another occasion, Maighstir Alasdair is said to have brutally flogged a Catholic neighbour, who had repeatedly grazed his cattle herd on the Rector's land. The local Catholic population was outraged and vowed to retaliate. A group of Catholic men led by Iain Caol MacDhunnachaidh ("Slender John Robertson") surprised Maighstir Alasdair near Dalilea and beat him so savagely that the Rector of Kilchoan had to be carried home in a blanket. Maighstir Alasdair and his family then fled their home and for a time took refuge on the island of Camas Drollaman in Loch Shiel. While they were in hiding on the island, Iain Caol is said to have shot a bird so that it fell at the feet of Maighstir Alasdair's wife. Iain Caol then told her that he would do the same to her husband if given the chance.

Maighstir Alasdair is said to have died in the 1720s. He lies buried next to his wife on Finnan's Island in Loch Shiel, on the south side of the ruined chapel, underneath a gravestone on which a skeleton has been carved.

Maighstir Alasdair was succeeded as tacksman of Dalilea by his eldest son, Aonghas Beag MacDhòmhnaill (Angus MacDonald, 2nd of Dalilea), who married Margaret Cameron, a devoutly Roman Catholic woman from Achadhuan, in Lochaber. According to Father Charles MacDonald, the places where Margaret MacDonald had said her prayers had survived in the oral tradition and were pointed out to him during the 1880s. Under Margaret's influence, Aonghas Beag MacDhòmhnaill converted from the Scottish Episcopal Church to Roman Catholicism and served as Captain over the men of Dalilea during the Jacobite Rising of 1745. He survived the Battle of Culloden and returned to his native district, where he had to remain in hiding for two years and only rarely dared to visit his family. After the act of indemnity was passed, Aonghas Beag MacDhòmhnaill returned to Dalilea, where he finished his days in peace.

In 1914, J. Wiseman MacDonald of Dalilea, an American-born descendant of Aonghas Beag and Margaret MacDhòmhnaill, purchased Castle Tioram in Loch Moidart, the traditional home of the Captain and Chief of Clanranald, and had much restoration work done on the ruins during the Interwar period.

The historic Episcopalian parish church at Kilchoan, which was dedicated to Saint Comgan, where Maighstir Alasdair served as Non-juring Rector, and where both Aonghas Beag and the Clanranald Bard were almost certainly baptized, is currently roofless and in ruins. The Baptismal Font, however, is still pointed out to those who ask.

Early life
Alasdair mac Mhaighstir Alasdair, the second son of the Rector of Kilchoan, was born at Dalilea at the beginning of the 18th century. The old part of Dalilea House, which is believed to date from the 15th century and where the Bard was born, is still extant. So, in fact, is an oak which the Bard is said to have planted in his youth.

There were no schools in the area and so it is thought that the younger Alasdair was educated by his father throughout his early years. The Bard is said to have enjoyed a fine grounding in the ancient corra litir (insular script) of the Clanranald bards, and in the classics (this is borne out by the references in his poetry to Ancient Greek and Roman literature). For example, his elegy upon a dove is believed to have been heavily influenced by Catullus' similar poem upon the death of Lesbia's sparrow.

Furthermore, Bishop Robert Forbes later wrote of the Bard, "He is a very smart, acute man, remarkably well skilled in the Erse, for he can both read and write the Irish language in its original character, a piece of knowledge almost quite lost in the Highlands of Scotland, there being exceedingly few that have any skill at all in that way. For the Captain told me that he did not know another person (old Clanranald excepted) that knew anything of the first tongue in its original character... Several of the Captain's acquaintances have told me that he is by far the best Erse poet in all Scotland, and that he has written many songs in the pure Irish."

According to John Lorne Campbell, there are no poems by the Bard in Classical Irish that are known to have survived. Campbell adds that the last Scottish Bard to have extant poetry in the Irish language is Niall MacMhuirich, who died in 1722.

In 1714, the Protestant Elector of Hanover mounted the British and Irish thrones as King George I and, with his assistance, the ascendent Whig political party seized absolute power and launched a purge of all Tories from the Government, the British Army, the Church of England, the legal profession, and local politics. Great Britain and Ireland became de facto single party states and were to remain so until King George III was crowned in 1760 and allowed the Tories back into the Government. Even so, some modern historians now call the period between 1714 and 1783 the, "age of the Whig oligarchy."

According to Derrick S. Thomson, Alasdair MacDhòmhnaill is "almost certainly" the author of the Journall and Memoirs of P- C- Expedition into Scotland, etc. 1745–46, which was later published in volume 2 of the Lockhart Papers. Even though he would have been only a teenager at the time, according to Derrick S. Thomson, "from one or two references there it could be thought that he", had also taken part in the Jacobite rising of 1715.

If so, both Alasdair and his brother Aonghas Beag would have been fighting on the right wing of the Jacobite Army during the Battle of Sherrifmuir and witnessed when Ailean Dearg, the Chief of their clan, fell mortally wounded. They also would have heard Alasdair Dubh, 11th Chief of Clan MacDonald of Glengarry rally the faltering warriors of Clan Donald by throwing up his blue bonnet and crying Buillean an-diugh, tuiream a-màireach! ("Blows today, mourning tomorrow!").

University education and marriage
Alasdair followed in the footsteps of his father and attended the University of Glasgow, and the University of Edinburgh, at a time when Scottish songs were gaining huge popularity. He is said to have left without receiving a degree. He is known, however, to have later set several of his poems to the airs played upon the Steeple of the Glasgow Tolbooth, near the Old College.

Derick Thomson suggests that the Bard's departure may have been due to his having married Jane MacDonald of Dalness (Sine Nic Dhòmhnaill).

Derick S. Thomson writes that Jane's family, the MacDonalds of Dalness, "had strong literary interests". Her father had composed a verse dialogue between Queen Anne and the Chief of Clan Stewart of Appin. Furthermore, the Gaelic song Tha mise seo 'm laighe is attributed to Jane's brother.

Alasdair later wrote the poem Òran d'a chéile nuadh-phósda in praise of his bride and referred to his father in law as, "The Rhymer".

According to Fr. Charles MacDonald, however, who interviewed the Bard's surviving relatives about their family's oral tradition, Alasdair left the university because his family could not afford the price of attending.

Alasdair was described as a fine singer, of tall height and broad chest, handsome in feature and fair in hair. Among his attributes were sincerity, honesty, loyalty to his friends and to his own convictions.

Protestant missioner

In 1729 Alasdair was appointed to a school at Finnan Island, at the head of Loch Shiel and only a few miles from Alasdair's ancestral home at Dalilea, as a teacher by the Society in Scotland for Propagating Christian Knowledge. He was the catechist of the same parish under the Royal Bounty Committee of the Church of Scotland; his position required him to teach at various locations throughout Moidart.

According to Marcus Tanner, the S.P.C.K. had been incorporated under Queen Anne in 1709 and was building both schools and libraries in the Highlands and Islands with a twofold purpose. The first purpose was to prevent the Gaels from returning to the strictly illegal and underground Catholic Church in Scotland. The second was to ensure, "that in process of time Britons from North to South may speak the same language". For this reason, Alasdair MacDhòmhnaill would have been under orders to teach his students only in English and to subject any student who spoke Gaelic inside the school or on the playground to corporal punishment.

According to John Lorne Campbell, "Too often Scottish writers, and particularly writers on the history of the Scottish Highlands, have confused 'education' with 'Calvinist indoctrination', such as was given in the S.P.C.K. schools in the Scottish Highlands and Islands, where the Westminster Confession of Faith, the Shorter Catechism, Vincent's Catechism, the Protestant's Resolutions, Pool's Dialogues, and Guthrie's Trials, all in English, formed the bulk of an unattractive list of school books.".

According to John Lorne Campbell, what the unpublished early minutes of the S.P.C.K. in Scotland reveals about its ideology and policies shows that Alasdair MacDhòmhnaill's employment from 1729 to 1745 as one of their schoolmasters was a violation of his natural loyalties as a member of the Clan MacDonald of Clanranald. Therefore, Campbell postulates that Alasdair must have had a dispute with Ranald (1692–1766), the 17th Chief of his Clan, and that this caused him to seek employment with the SSPK.

From 1738 to 1744, Alasdair MacDhòmhnaill taught at the school attached to his father's former parish church at Kilchoan. He also supplemented his salary of £16 a year by renting the farm at Coire Mhuilinn, where he composed one of his most famous poems: Allt an t-Siùcar (The Sugar Brook).

In 1741, the Bard compiled a 200-page Gaelic-English vocabulary at the request of the Society, which published it with a dedication to the Marquess of Lothian. As source material and a model for his spelling, Alasdair used the existing Irish language translations of the "Confession of Faith", the Westminster Shorter Catechism, and the Book of Common Prayer.

In his dedication to the volume, the Bard wrote, "It seems to have been reserved for you to be the happy instruments of bringing about the Reformation  of the Highlands and Islands of Scotland, diverse places of which are remote from the means of obtaining instruction; and indeed when we consider the situation of the inhabitants, their ignorance, their inclinations to follow the customs, fashions, and superstitions of their forefathers, the number of Popish Emmissaries in many places of these countries; and add to that their way of life, the unfrequented passes and the distance of their houses from one another, one would not think, but that an attempt to reform them would be a very arduous task to be brought about, even by the most desirable means."

According to John Lorne Campbell, "His Galick and English Vocabulary was commissioned by the S.P.C.K. for use in their schools in furthering their policy of replacing Gaelic by English as the vernacular of the Highlands and Islands... No doubt the reading MacDonald did in preparing this translation, for which he was ultimately paid the princely sum of £10, helped to develop his powerful command of the resources of the Gaelic language." The vocabulary was the first secular book to be printed in Scottish Gaelic.

In a 2016 article, Alan Riach expressed the belief that compiling the first Gaelic dictionary convinced Alasdair mac Mhaighstir Alasdair that the Gaelic language deserved preservation and that this new belief caused him to turn against the S.S.P.K. and everything it stood for.

Alasdair MacDhòmhnaill's whereabouts during the year of 1744 are unknown. The SSPK believed him to have "deserted his post to help rally the Jacobite clans" and criticized him for charging his sixteen-year-old son Raonuill Dubh MacDhòmhnaill with his teaching duties. Early in 1745, the Bard was summoned to Edinburgh by the Royal Bounty Committee, which had heard that he was composing erotic poetry in Gaelic. He ignored the summons. The SSPK finally dismissed Alasdair in a minute dated 14 July 1745.

Jacobite officer and war poet

Jacobite songs penned by Alasdair such as: Òran Nuadh — "A New Song", Òran nam Fineachan Gaidhealach — "The Song of the Highland Clans" and Òran do'n Phrionnsa — "A Song to the Prince," serve as testament to the Bard's own passion for the Jacobite cause. 

In the introduction to his groundbreaking 1933 volume Highland Songs of the Forty-Five, John Lorne Campbell explained that, contrary to widely held beliefs, the Scottish Gàidhealtachd during the 18th-century was far from isolated from the literature and culture of the outside world. For example, Campbell explained, the Jacobite war poetry of Alasdair mac Mhaighstir Alasdair shows a very clear understanding of the religious, political, and dynastic issues at stake and abounds with learned allusions to figures from Classical mythology, the Christian Bible, and from both the Mythological and Fenian Cycles of Celtic mythology.

According to literary historian John MacKenzie, these poems were sent to Aeneas MacDonald, the brother of the Clanranald tacksman of Kinlochmoidart, who was a banker in Paris. Aeneas read the poems aloud to Prince Charles Edward Stuart in English translation and the poems played a major role in convincing the Prince to come to Scotland and to initiate the Jacobite Rising of 1745.

On 25 July 1745, the Prince arrived at Loch nan Uamh from Eriskay aboard the French privateer Du Teillay. The Bard was one of the first to go aboard.

According to Bishop Robert Forbes, "He did not then know that the Prince was among the passengers, who being in very plain dress, Captain MacDonald made up to him without any manner of ceremony, and conversed with him in a very familiar way, sitting close by the Prince and drinking a glass with him, till one of the name of MacDonald made him such a look that immediately he began to suspect he was using too much freedom with one above his own rank. Upon this he soon withdrew, but was still in the dark about what particular person the young gentleman he had been conversing with might be."

According to the local oral tradition, the Prince is said to have called upon the Bard's family at Dalilea House, during his journey up Loch Shiel on the way to the raising of his Standard.

On 19 August 1745, Alasdair MacDhòmhnaill witnessed the raising of the Prince's Standard at Glenfinnan, which signalled the beginning of the campaign. He is also said to have sung his song of welcome: Tearlach Mac Sheumais. Afterwards he became the "Tyrtaeus of the Highland Army" and "the most persuasive of recruiting sergeants".

Many of his surviving poems and songs openly glorify the Jacobite cause and satirise and revile those, like Clan Campbell, who sided with the House of Hanover.

Alasdair's name appears upon a "Roll of Men upon Clanranald's Mainland Estates, with their arms, made up in 1745", with a gun and pistol.

His first commission was as a captain in the Clan Ranald Regiment where he was placed in command of 50 "cliver fellows" whom he personally recruited in Ardnamurchan. Amongst his other responsibilities, the Bard was appointed to teach Scottish Gaelic to the Prince due to his "skill in the Highland Language."

Like his brother Aonghas Beag, the Bard converted during this period from Protestantism to the still illegal and underground Catholic Church in Scotland. According to Father Charles MacDonald, who interviewed Alasdair's surviving relatives, the Bard's conversion was due to the example and influence of Margaret Cameron MacDonald, his devoutly Roman Catholic sister-in-law. Alasdair mac Mhaighstir Alasdair fought alongside the Clanranald men for the duration of the campaign which ended with the crushing defeat and the no quarter given to the Jacobite Army at the Battle of Culloden.

The Year of the Pillaging

In the aftermath of the Battle of Culloden, it is believed that the Bard remained with the Prince for at least part of the latter's flight. John Lorne Campbell believes that the Bard may have been one of the survivors of the Clanranald Regiment who joined the Prince at Glenbiastill in Arisaig, four or five days after the disaster of Culloden.

Due to the "arbitrary and malicious violence" that Hanoverian Redcoats inflicted, the aftermath of Culloden is still referred to in the Highlands and Islands as Bliadhna nan Creach ("The Year of the Pillaging").

After the Prince escaped to France, both the Bard and his elder brother Aonghas Beag were fugitives in their own country; both Alasdair's house and his brother's mansion at Dalilea were plundered by Hanoverian redcoats. Even the bard's cat was killed lest it might provide food for his wife and children.

According to non-juring Episcopal Bishop Robert Forbes, who interviewed the Bard for a collection of Jacobite memoirs, "Captain MacDonald and his wife and children wandered through hills and mountains until the act of indemnity appeared, and in the time of their skulking from place to place his poor wife fell ill with child, which happened to be a daughter, and is still alive."

The Bard's conversion to Catholicism had caused him to be mocked and reviled while engaging in Flyting, or the exchange of insults in verse, with a fellow Scottish Gaelic poet called "The Mull Satirist." Even though the Mull Satirist accused Alasdair MacDhòmhnaill of becoming a Catholic solely out of political careerism and a desire to curry the favor of the House of Stuart Government in Exile in the Papal States, the Bard did not revert to Presbyterianism despite the often savage anti-Catholic and Anti-Episcopalian religious persecution that followed the defeat of the Uprising.

At their second meeting, the Bard gave Bishop Forbes two pieces of the eight-oared boat in which the Prince had sailed from Borodale to Benbecula in the aftermath of Culloden. The Bishop preserved them as a relic.

After the Highlands grudgingly became more peaceful, Alasdair received the farm at Eignaig on the Glenuig estate, from the Captain of Clanranald. He remained there with his family until 1751.

On 22 April 1751, the Bard met again with Bishop Forbes at Leith and provided the latter with a detailed account of the atrocities committed by Hanoverian redcoats on the islands of Canna and Eigg.

Ais-Eiridh na Sean Chánoin Albannaich
Alasdair then travelled to Edinburgh with the purpose of publishing his volume of poems entitled: Ais-Eiridh na Sean Chánoin Albannaich — (The Resurrection of the Old Scottish Language).

It has been written by Fr. Charles MacDonald that, "It is very characteristic of his reckless courage that he published these poems, breathing rebellion in every line, and pouring the vials of his wrath upon the whole race of the Georges, five years after the battle at Culloden."

In the title to this volume, the Bard described himself as the Bailie of Canna. According to John Lorne Campbell, "It is difficult to account for this appointment, as Canna was part of the Clanranald estates, which were forfeited, and the Government was certainly not in the habit of appointing Jacobites to administer the forfeited properties. He does not seem to have occupied the position very long."

An Airce 

Ais-Eiridh na Sean Chánoin Albannaich included the poem, An Airce ("The Ark"), a biting satire aimed at the Whigs of Clan Campbell.

Like the Irish language Bard Brian Merriman, Alasdair begins by parodying the conventions of the Aisling, a Jacobite verse form based on both Medieval Dream vision poetry and an early 17th-century convention invented by Fr. Geoffrey Keating in which a former deity from Irish mythology is seen weeping for a recently fallen hero.

According to Daniel Corkery, "The Aisling proper is Jacobite poetry; and a typical example would run something like this: The poet, weak with thinking of the woe that has overtaken the Gael, falls into a deep slumber. In his dreaming a figure of radiant beauty draws near. She is so bright, so stately, the poet imagines her one of the immortals. Is she Deirdre? Is she Gearnait? Or is she Helen? Or Venus? He questions her, and learns that she is Erin; and her sorrow, he is told, is for her true mate who is in exile beyond the seas. This true mate is, according to the date of the composition, either the Old or Young Pretender; and the poem ends with a promise of speedy redemption on the return of the King's son."

In Alasdair's hands, the conventions of the Aisling were given a cynical and comedic twist.

Instead of a woman, the Bard describes a meeting with the ghost of a Campbell who was beheaded for supporting the Stuart claim to the throne. The ghost then tells the Bard that the Campbells will soon be punished for committing high treason against their lawful King, first being visited by the Ten Plagues of Egypt and then by another Great Flood upon their lands.

The Bard is instructed to emulate Noah by building an Ark for carefully selected Campbells. The moderates will be welcomed aboard the Ark's decks after being purged of their Whiggery by swallowing a heavy dose of seawater. Redcoats from the Campbell of Argyll Militia are to be tied with millstones and thrown overboard.

A female poet of the clan who had mocked Prince Charles and accused him of illegitimacy was to be treated to a fitting punishment before being delivered right into the Bard's hands.
 

Also, Colin Roy Campbell of Glenure, who has been appointed as the Crown's Factor on the forfeited lands of Clan Stewart of Appin and Clan Cameron of Lochiel, is one of the few Whigs for whom the ghost confesses a certain respect:

Reaction and aftermath
According to Father Charles MacDonald, "In other passages he prays that the Butcher may have a rope tied around his neck and may be made to swing from it., – a blessing to which, if it could do any good, many a Highlander today would respond with a hearty amen. His choicest of offering to the King is the Scottish Maiden – i.e. the Guillotine – and so on. But these extravagant forms of lese majeste, and of course not at all to be approved of, even in a poet."

Revealing that he saw the Jacobite risings as the continuation of the war his ancestors had waged against Oliver Cromwell, the Covenanters, and the Rump Parliament, Alasdair's book included English-Gaelic literary translations of three poems by Cavalier poet and Royalist General James Graham, 1st Marquess of Montrose, which expressed his loyalty to King Charles I and to the House of Stuart during the English Civil War.

According to Hamish MacPherson, "One of the many contradictions about Alasdair was that he was a fine writer about love, but also wrote some very bawdy work – he wrote Praise of Morag about his wife which is full of sensual double entendres but also wrote Dispraise of Morag which is out-and-out obscene."

According to an 2017 article by Peter Mackay, the two poems that Alasdair mac Mhaighstir Alasdair wrote about his wife are both based on the Great Highland bagpipe musical rhythms known as pibroch. In Praise of Morag the Bard likens his wife's breasts to geal criostal ("white crystal") and the lily of the valley, while comparing her skin to bog cotton and her kisses to cinnamon. In Dispraise of Morag, which was composed after his wife discovered her husband's infidelity, Morag NicDhòmhnaill was dubbed, A bhan-pheacach sin gun loinn, Làn de dh’fhòtas innt ("A graceless sinful girl, full of stinking pus").

According to John Lorne Campbell, two of the poems in Ais-Eridh na Sean Chánoin Albannaich, Òran air Sean aois ("A Song on Old Age") and Comh-radh, Mar go b' ann eider caraid agus namhaid an Uisgebheatha ("A Dialogue between a Friend and a Foe of Whisky"), were actually composed by Alasdair's close friend, the North Uist bard Iain Mac Fhearchair.

The same collection also includes the poem Guidhe no Ùrnaigh an Ùghdair don Cheòlraidh ("The Author’s Petition or Prayer to the Muses"), which the Bard addresses to the Nine Muses and which, "reflects ruefully upon his own poetic powers." Another poem, Tineas na h-Urchaid ("The Venereal Disease") mocks the rotting flesh and the other symptoms of gonorrhea. It was composed during an outbreak of venereal disease among the population of Ardnamurchan and the Western Highlands.

According to John Lorne Campbell, "The invective he heaped on the reigning House and its supporters gained him the enthusiastic approval of friends and the severe displeasure of the Government. MacDonald himself escaped prosecution, but the unsold copies of the book were seized and burned by the public hangman in Edinburgh market-place in 1752."

Linguist Robert Dunbar, however, has called Alasdair mac Mhaighstir, "the greatest poet of the eighteenth century Golden Age of Gaelic poets", and adds that the 1751 publication of Ais-eridh na Sean Chánoin Albannaich inspired the publication of, "an increasing number of important collections of Gaelic poetry."

In a 2020 article, Scottish nationalist Hamish MacPherson expressed the belief that Alasdair's authorship of, "the world’s first printed collection of Gaelic poetry... alone should make him worth revering, not least because its visceral criticism of the Hanoverian dynasty and the satire he employed to berate them are works of genius."

Later life
Soon after the publication, the Captain and Chief of Clanranald evicted the Bard from the farm at Eignaig. An additional reason for this was that Father Harrison, the local Roman Catholic priest, had objected to the Bard's composition of erotic poetry.

According to Father Charles MacDonald, the dispute between the Bard and Father Harrison was not only moral but also political. At the beginning of the Uprising, Father Harrison had appeared before the Sheriff of Argyllshire at Inverary and had sworn under oath that he took no part in politics, was as loyal to the House of Hanover, "as a good Patriot should be", and that he, " regretted that any of his co-religionists should have allowed himself to be involved in an enterprise so foolhardy," as the Jacobite rising of 1745. In response, the Sheriff had given Father Harrison a pass which was shown to any militia officers who encountered him. Father Harrison's pass made him, according to Father Charles MacDonald, the only Roman Catholic priest in the Highlands and Islands who was never imprisoned or even harassed during the 1745 rising or its aftermath. To the Bard, however, Father Harrison's loyalty to the Hanoverians was nothing short of treasonous and had marked him out as a sagairt na cuigse, or ("Priest for the Whigs").

The Bard responded to his eviction at Father Harrison's urging by reviling Eignaig in satirical poetry.

He moved again to Inverie in Knoydart, to Morar. While in Morar, the Bard composed a poem in praise of both the place and of Bishop Hugh MacDonald, the priests, and students at the clandestine minor seminary in nearby Buorblach, who were less critical of his poetry and politics than Father Harrison had been.

According to Alan Riach, the Bard is believed to have composed his poem The Birlinn of Clanranald, which is about the troubled voyage of a Highland War Galley from the ghost town of Loch Eynort in South Uist to Carrickfergus and which remained unpublished until after his death, during the 1750s. Although Gaelic poetry was once assumed to be isolated from the literature of other languages, Alan Riach argues, "With Duncan Ban MacIntyre, you have someone who is illiterate but fluent in Gaelic, and composes his poetry to be sung, to be performed, as music; with Alasdair mac Mhaighstir Alasdair and The Birlinn of Clanranald you have an extremely sophisticated poet who reads fluently in a number of languages. So he’s familiar with Homer and Virgil and the great epics of classical literature. He’s familiar with poetry being written in English at the time. He’s familiar with poetry written in Scots. His own writing in Gaelic is part of that continuum, part of that context."

The Captain and Chief of Clanranald then granted him land at Camas an t-Salainn and then Sandaig in Arisaig.

He frequently travelled to North Uist, where he had a close friend in Iain Mac Fhearchair (John MacCodrum), the famed bard to Sir James MacDonald of Sleat.

Death

In his 1889 book Moidart: Among the Clanranalds, Father Charles MacDonald recorded the Bard's last moments from the oral tradition of Moidart, "In his last illness he was carefully nursed by his Arisaig friends, two of whom on the night of his decease, finding the hours rather monotonous, and thinking that he was asleep, began to recite in an undertone some verses of their own composition. To their astonishment, however, the bard raised himself up, and, smiling at their inexperienced efforts, pointed out how the ideas might be improved and the verses made to run in another and smoother form, at the same time giving an illustration in a few original measures of his own. He then sank back on the pillow and immediately expired. It was proposed at first to carry his remains to Eilean Fhionnain  – Island Finnan, but the project, owing to a severe gale then raging along the coast, had to be abandoned. The Arisaig people thereupon got their own way, and Alasdair Mac Mhaighstir Alasdair was buried in the cemetery of Kilmorie, close to the present Catholic church of Arisaig."

Although the exact location of the Bard's grave is no longer known, a wall plaque was erected in 1927 in St. Mary's Roman Catholic cemetery in Arisaig "by a few Jacobite admirers in New Zealand and some fellow clansmen at home, in recognition of his greatness as a Gaelic poet".

Literary and cultural legacy
Alasdair mac Mhaighstir Alasdair may be said to rank first among all the bards of the Scottish Gaels, perhaps with only Sorley MacLean, of more recent fame, as an exception. He "owed little or nothing either to his predecessors or his contemporaries" in the field of poetry and many of his poems are available in anthologies of Scottish poetry.

According to Alan Riach, Alasdair mac Mhaighstir Alasdair's high level of education, his ability to read and write in his own language, and his multilingual understanding of the Western canon from Classical literature to the time of the French and Scottish Enlightenments, is what sets him apart from the other truly great Gaelic poets of the era.

According to Derrick S. Thomson, "He was a man of strong views and violent emotions but with a hard intellectual cast of mind also; he was learned in the Gaelic tradition and open to influence from his other reading; he was an innovator and a conservative; and his poetry is full of the stimulating contradictions that proceed from these diversities."

Long before legendary Canadian Gaelic poet Iain mac Ailein, the former Bard to the 15th Chief of Clan Maclean of Coll, emigrated with his family from Tiree to Nova Scotia in 1819, Iain mac Ailein was only one of many Gaelic-speaking Seanchaidhe who could recite the entirety of Alasdair mac Mhaighstir Alasdair's immram poem Birlinn Chloinne Raghnaill ("The Birlinn of Clanranald"), from memory.

Furthermore, Iain mac Ailein also carried with him when he emigrated an extremely rare first edition copy of the Clanranald Bard's Ais-eridh na Sean Chánoin Albannaich. In 1915, MacLean's grandson, Presbyterian minister Rev. Alexander MacLean Sinclair, donated his grandfather's copy of the book to St. Francis Xavier University in Antigonish, Nova Scotia. In a letter to the university's Rector, Rev. Hugh P. MacPherson, Rev. Sinclair apologized for having razored out everything between pages 152 and 161, which he called, "abominably filthy". These pages had contained two of Alasdair mac Mhaighstir Alasdair's most famous works of erotic poetry; Moladh air Deagh Bhod ("In Praise of a Good Penis") and Tineas na h-Urchaid ("The Venereal Disease").

Including the copy that was censored by Rev. Sinclair, only twelve copies of the original edition of Ais-eridh na Sean Chánoin Albannaich are now known to exist. The same book, in censored editions, continued to appear repeatedly during the 18th and 19th centuries.

According to John Lorne Campbell, however, "...no satisfactory text of MacDonald's poems has yet been produced. Apart from the peculiarities of his own spelling – which represents nearly the first attempt to adapt the orthography of the old literary language common to Scotland and Ireland to the vernacular of the Highlands – he uses forms which are not now employed in modern speech, and which have been consequently removed by all his editors from MacPherson onwards, presumably as a concession to readers unwilling to acquaint themselves with obsolete forms of the language."

Even so, The Clanranald Bard's influence over Scottish culture continues.

During the 1951 Edinburgh People's Festival Ceilidh, which brought Scottish traditional music to a large public stage for the first time and is now considered to be one of the beginnings of the British folk revival. The concert took place inside Edinburgh's Oddfellows Hall and continued long afterwards at St. Columba's Church Hall on Friday 26 August 1951. The Scottish Gàidhealtachd was represented by Flora MacNeil, fellow Barra native Calum Johnston, and John Burgess. The music was recorded live at the scene by American musicologist Alan Lomax.

During the Ceilidh, two Scottish Gaelic songs about the Jacobite rising of 1745 were performed onstage.

Beforehand, master of ceremonies Hamish Henderson announced, "One of the great movements two hundred years ago was the Jacobite movement, the last great Stuart rebellion, and in the West of Scotland it brought out many fine songs. The song that you're going to hear now from Calum Johnston is one of the songs of Alexander MacDonald, the Clanranald Bard, Alasdair mac Mhaighstir Alasdair. And the song he's going to sing is one called 'A New Song for the Prince'. The words mean, 'Early in the morning as I wakened, great my joy, for I hear that he comes to the land of Clanranald."

Calum Johnston, who was "keen to show his own admiration for [the] poet and for the Highlanders who fought for Charlie", then delivered a passionate rendition of Alasdair mac Mhaighstir Alasdair's Òran Eile don Phrionnsa ("Another Song to the Prince"). Flora MacNeil then performed, Mo rùn geal òg, Catriona Nic Fhearghais's lament for her husband, Uilleam Siseal (William Chisholm of Strathglass), who fell bearing the standard of Clan Chisholm for the House of Stuart during the Battle of Culloden in 1746.

During the 21st-century, Ballachulish-based poet and musician Griogair Labhruidh also performed Alasdair mac Mhaighstir Alasdair's Òran Eile don Phrionnsa ("Another Song to the Prince"), titled by its first line Moch sa Mhadainn 's Mi a' Dùsgadh, ​as part of the Soundtrack for the 2nd and 4th Seasons of the TV series Outlander.

Due to the recent rise of Scottish nationalism, the progressing devolution of Great Britain, the passing of the Gaelic Language (Scotland) Act 2005, and the resulting campaign to bring the Gaelic language back from the brink of extinction through  immersion schools funded by the Scottish Parliament, interest in Alasdair mac Mhaighstir Alasdair has grown. Ironically, despite his own personal Monarchism, the Clanranald Bard is also having a growing influence upon activists for Scottish independence and even republicanism.

In a 2020 article, Scottish nationalist Hamish MacPherson called it, "a national disgrace that there is no national monument" anywhere in Scotland to the Clanranald Bard. MacPherson then wrote, "I believe Alasdair is a poet whose personal journey is an example to all of us who have joined the cause of independence and all those who are still to be converted. For Alasdair was a linguistic innovator who was a scholar of the Classics but became the champion of Gaelic and the culture of the Gael, a Protestant teacher who converted to Catholicism, and a man of peace who fought for Prince Charles Edward Stuart in the 1745 Jacobite Rising. In other words, someone who found his true beliefs and fought for them with words as his chief weapons – shouldn't that be all of us Scots?"

Descendants
His son, Raonuill Dubh MacDhòmhnuill (lit. "Black Ranald", officially Ranald MacDonald, 1st of Laig) (c.1715-c.1805), was also a famous Gaelic poet who published Comh-chruinneachidh Orannaigh Gaidhealach, which is also called "The Eigg Collection", at Edinburgh in 1776. Raonuill Dubh is believed to have drawn heavily upon oral poetry collected and written down by his father and also upon the similar collection made by Hector Maclean of Grulin.

According to a 1964 oral history interview with Eigg seanchaidh Donald Archie MacDonald, both Raonuill Dubh MacDhòmhnuill and his son, Aonghas Lathair MacDhòmhnuill (lit. "Strong Angus", officially Angus MacDonald, 2nd of Laig), were hereditary tacksmen of Laig in Eigg from around 1775. During the Highland Clearances of the mid-1820s, Aonghas Lathair MacDhòmhnuill gained local notoriety by beginning the planned eviction of the whole village of Cleadale. Aonghas Lathair was acting under orders from Ranald George Macdonald, 19th Chief of Clanranald, who intended, like many other Anglo-Scottish landlords of the era, to replace the Crofters of Cleadale with much more profitable herds of Cheviot and black faced sheep. Aonghas Lathair planned to assign the management of the sheep upon the cleared village to his brother-in-law, but severe hardships then fell upon Aonghas Lathair and his family, which ultimately resulted in the tacksman committing suicide. According to the local oral tradition, the old people of Eigg blamed the MacDonald family's misfortune on a curse that was said to have been put on them by the women whom Aonghas Lathair had evicted from Cleadale. In 1827, the 19th Chief of Clanranald sold Eigg, after 800 years of ancestral ownership, to Dr. Hugh MacPherson and further evictions from Cleadale were cancelled.

Angus R. MacDonald, the son of Raonuill Dubh's son Allan and Alasdair mac Mhaighstir Alasdair's last direct descendant, at first carried on with the family's rented farm on Eigg after the death of his father and then emigrated to the United States with his mother. He served as a Lieutenant in the 11th Wisconsin Regiment during the American Civil War. He "distinguished himself by his gallantry during the operations of the Federal Army in Alabama and Mississippi." After being wounded in action by Confederate troops, Lieut. MacDonald returned to Wisconsin and settled into a civil service job. He never married, died without issue in Milwaukee, and the direct line of the Bard became extinct.

Folklore
 According to John Lorne Campbell, ghost stories about sightings of the undead spectre of Alasdair mac Mhaighstir Alasdair or of his brother Lachlan on South Uist and other islands are very common in Hebridean mythology and folklore.
 The following story was recorded on the isle of Canna from "Aonghus Eachainn" by Dr. Calum Maclean of the Irish Folklore Commission. The translation is by John Lorne Campbell, "Alexander MacDonald was for a time living in Canna. He was bailie for one of the Clanranalds when they had Canna. One fine day he was going over to Uist in a rowing boat, and some old men of the island were down at the place called Gob a' Rubha, the point past the pier. When Alexander was going past, one of the old men who was fishing for cuddies said to him: 'Won't you give your opinion of us now, Alasdair?' 'I will do that,' he said; and he said to them:

Gaelic naming conventions

 The poet's Gaelic name means "Alasdair, son of the Reverend Alasdair". His father, also named Alasdair, was known as Maighstir Alasdair ("Master Alexander") which was then the way of referring to a clergyman in Scottish Gaelic.  In English, Maighstir Alasdair was known as the "Reverend Alexander MacDonald".

References

Further reading
 Edited by Eberhard Bort (2011), Tis Sixty Years Since: The 1951 Edinburgh People's Festival Ceilidh and the Scottish Folk Revival, Grace Note Publishing
 John Lorne Campbell (1984), Canna; The Story of a Hebridean Island, Oxford University Press.
 John Lorne Campbell (1979), Highland Songs of the Forty-Five, Arno Press, New York City
 Charles MacDonald (2011), Moidart: Among the Clanranalds, Birlinn Press
 Peadar Ó Muircheartaigh (2020), 'Bìrlinn Chlann Raghnaill: Long a fuair foscadh in Éirinn', COMHARTaighde 6:
 Derick S. Thomson (1987), The Companion to Gaelic Scotland, (Blackwell Reference 1987),

External links
 Findagrave Memorial for Alasdair mac Mhaighstir  Alasdair
 Poetry on Wikisource (in Scottish Gaelic)
Digitised version of Alasdair mac Mhaighstir Alasdair's Ais-Eiridh na Sean Chánoin Albannaich / The resurrection of the ancient Scottish language, 1751 at the National Library of Scotland. Contains a Preface in and literary translations from English, plus original poetry in both Latin and Scottish Gaelic.
 As Described by the "Clan Donald Society of Edinburgh"
 "Bards of the 'Forty-Five"
 The Poems of Mac Mhaighistir Alasdair (In Gaelic) (Archived 2009-10-25)
Allt an t-Siùcar performed by Jenna Chuimeanach, 2020.
 Not Burns – Alasdair Mac Mhaighstir Alasdair! by Alan Riach, The National: The Newspaper that Supports an Independent Scotland, 11, February 2016.
The Scottish Poetry Library interviews Alan Riach about Alasdair mac Mhaighstir Alasdair, June 2016.
Willies, ghillies and horny Highlanders: Scottish Gaelic writing has a filthy past by Peter MacKay, University of St. Andrews, The Conversation, 24 October 2017.
 A great Scot, too aft forgot: Alasdair mac Mhaighstir Alasdair by Hamish MacPherson, The National: The Newspaper that Supports an Independent Scotland, 13, January 2020.

1698 births
1770 deaths
18th-century diarists
18th-century lexicographers
18th-century Scottish Gaelic poets
18th-century Scottish poets
Alumni of the University of Edinburgh
Alumni of the University of Glasgow
Alasdair
Clan MacDonald of Clanranald
Converts to Roman Catholicism from Anglicanism
Converts to Roman Catholicism from Presbyterianism
Jacobite poets
Jacobite propagandists
Jacobite military personnel of the Jacobite rising of 1745
New Latin-language poets
People from Lochaber
Scottish Catholic poets
Scottish diarists
Scottish folklore
Scottish ghosts
Scottish Jacobites
Scottish lexicographers
Scottish memoirists
Scottish outlaws
Scottish political writers
Scottish Roman Catholics
Scottish schoolteachers
Translators to Scottish Gaelic